The official Chinatown of Perth, Western Australia is bounded by Roe Street and James Street in the inner city suburb of Northbridge. Located within Chinatown are 13 restaurants and businesses. Many more Asian businesses are found further north around William Street near Brisbane Street, an area known informally for this reason as the "real Chinatown", and throughout both the Perth metropolitan region and the rest of Western Australia.

The City of Vincent (whose council boundary starts from Newcastle Street) has installed Asiatic themed street lights and street furniture to reflect the proliferation of Asian businesses in this area (see corner of William Street and Forbes Road). Businesses include restaurants, hair salons, grocery stores, travel agencies, Daiguo shipping companies, and medicine shops. The Vietnamese Buddhist Association and Temple is also located just off William Street on Money Street.

While the area known informally as "real Chinatown" has always had a high proportion of non-Anglo migrants, its make-up has changed with time. During the 1970s and 1980s, during which the Vietnam War ended and the Indochina refugee crisis began, the area housed Vietnamese migrants. Prior to this it was a Jewish quarter with Jewish businesses in the area; some still remain but are primarily landowners. Well known migrant business Kakulas Brothers still operate their wholesale operations off William Street on Wellman Street. From 2010 there has been a steady increase of mainland Chinese businesses as well as Korean businesses operating in the area.

Historically many Chinese (usually of Malaysian, Singaporean or Indonesian background) settled in Northbridge alongside other immigrant groups.  However, the city's low population density and comparatively low-cost property encourages migrants to move to the expanding suburbs. Likewise, overseas students often chose to live in suburbs near the universities they attend, such as Bentley, Murdoch and Nedlands.

Transport
The closest train station to Chinatown is Perth railway station, to its south-east on Roe Street.

References

Further reading
 
 
 
 
 
 

Perth
Asian-Australian culture in Western Australia